Lamiya is a given name and surname. It may refer to:
Ashagi Lamiya, Indian artist, TV presenter, screen writer
Lamiya Haji Bashar, Yezidi human rights activist
Lamiya Abed Khadawi (?-2005), Iraqi politician and Member of Parliament

See also
Lamia (given name) with Lamiya and Lamija being alternatives of the name